Teet Allas (born 2 June 1977) is a retired Estonian professional footballer. He played the position of defender.

After his footballer career he became a football referee.

Club career
Allas was born in Pärnu.  His former clubs include Pärnu Kalev, Vall Tallinn, Lelle SK, and JK Viljandi Tulevik and FC Flora Tallinn.

In 2010, he played for Dalkurd FF.

In March 2011 he signed a deal with Estonian Meistriliiga club Paide Linnameeskond.

International career
He was a regular with the Estonian national team. He has got 73 caps and 2 goal since 1997. He made his debut on 1 March 1997 against Azerbaijan.

International goals

Scores and results table. Estonia's goal tally first:

Honours

Individual
 Estonian Silverball: 2002

References

External links

1977 births
Living people
Sportspeople from Pärnu
Viljandi JK Tulevik players
FC Flora players
Paide Linnameeskond players
Estonian footballers
Estonia international footballers
Estonian expatriate footballers
Expatriate footballers in Sweden
Estonian expatriate sportspeople in Sweden
Dalkurd FF players
Association football defenders
JK Tervis Pärnu players
Estonian football referees